Berthelinia rottnesti is a species of a sea snail with a shell comprising two separate hinged pieces or valves. It is a marine gastropod mollusc in the family Juliidae.

Distribution
The type locality for this species is Rottnest Island, Southwestern Australia.

Description
Berthelinia rottnesti is approximately 6 mm.

Ecology
This species can be found in algae and seaweed beds.

References

Juliidae
Gastropods described in 1993